Rudolf Fischer (6 March 1901 – 4 June 1957) was a German writer.

Life
Rudolf Fischer was born in Dresden. He came from a working-class family.  After he had taken the Abitur in 1921, he worked as a salesman. He would become unemployed and later was employed as a mail carrier. During World War II he worked for the Feldpost.

After the war, Fischer suffered with health problems, which continued in the post-war era. He began writing narratives and experienced the demands of state jobs of East Germany. He worked as a face worker in the Zwickau coal mines as a source of studying. He received the 1956 Heinrich Mann Prize. He died in Dresden in 1957.

Rudolf Fischer became known mainly for his novel "Martin Hoop IV" one of the East German critics' highest praised work of socialist realism, in which the authentic collapse through sabotage set off a firedamp in the Zwickau Mine Four from the year 1952 and described its consequences.

Works
Martin Hoop IV, Berlin 1955
Dem Unbekannten auf der Spur (The Unknown from the Trail), Berlin 1956

References

External links
Literature by and on Rudolf Fischer in the catalog of the German National Library 

1901 births
1957 deaths
Writers from Dresden
People from the Kingdom of Saxony
East German writers
Heinrich Mann Prize winners
20th-century German novelists
German male novelists
20th-century German male writers